Lauren Allan (born 14 November 1996) is an Australian soccer player who plays for the Newcastle Jets.

Allan grew up near Newcastle, and played for the Women's Premier League for several years, and at the State Cup. She also played soccer at college in the United States at Anderson University and at Butler Community College where she was majoring in physical therapy.

Allan was selected in the Jets' squad for the 2019–20 W-League season, where she debuted in the opening game of the season and was a regular player on the field. She was used as a substitute for the first few games until she was given her first start in a 4–2 loss against Perth Glory in round 11. In that game Allan scored her first goal.

References 

Living people
1996 births
Australian women's soccer players
People from Newcastle, New South Wales
Newcastle Jets FC (A-League Women) players
Women's association football forwards
Sportswomen from New South Wales
Soccer players from New South Wales
21st-century Australian women